XHCIF-FM is a radio station in Calvillo, Aguascalientes, owned by Comunicación Integral para la Familia, A.C.

References

Radio stations in Aguascalientes